The Karlovac 10K (Croatian: Karlovački cener) is an annual road running event over 10 kilometres (6.2 mi) which takes place in June or July in Karlovac, Croatia. Established in 2013, the race goes through the roads of Karlovac historic centre, near Kupa and Korana rivers and finishes in the same place it started. The race consists of four laps, and time limit is 1 hour and 30 minutes. It's the one and only Croatian race with World Athletics Bronze Label status. The race often has a title sponsorship, and is currently branded as the "Heineken 0.0 Karlovac 10K". In 2020, about 600 Runners took part in the race.

Elite race winners 
Key:

References

External links
  Homepage

10K runs